Aquarius remigis, known as the common water strider, is a species of aquatic bug. It was formerly known as Gerris remigis, but the subgenus Aquarius was elevated to
generic rank in 1990 on the basis of phylogenetic analysis. Aquarius remigis is found throughout North America, but is most prevalent in the mid-west of the United States.

Description
Aquarius remigis grows slightly longer than .5 inches, and is dark brown to black in colour. It has a sharp rostrum that it uses to pierce the body of its prey and suck out the insides.

Behaviour
They normally continue to move to avoid being eaten by predators. It has good vision, and can row quickly over the surface of the water. It uses its front legs to seize its prey.

During breeding season, this species can communicate with potential mates by sending ripples over on the surface of the water.

Adult females normally lay their eggs on plant stems at the water's edge.

Diet

This predatory species feeds on mosquito larvae living under the surface, and dead insects on the surface, and other insects that accidentally land on the water.

References

Further reading
Fairbairn, D. J. 1985. A test of the hypothesis of compensatory upstream dispersal using a stream-dwelling waterstrider, Gerris remigis Say. Oecologia 66:147-153.
Fairbairn, D. J. 1985. Comparative ecology of Gerris remigis (Hemiptera, Heteroptera) in two habitats: a paradox of habitat choice. Canadian Journal of Zoology 63:2594-2603.
Fairbairn, D. J. 1986. Does alary dimorphism imply dispersal dimorphism in the waterstrider, Gerris remigis? Ecological Entomology 11:355-368.

External links
 Image
 Images
 Sperm competition in the water strider, Gerris remigis, Daniel I. Rubenstein, Princeton
 Comparative Life History Evolution In The Water Strider, Gerris Remigis (Quantitative Genetics, Demographics, Pennsylvania), Michael J Firko, University Of Pennsylvania
 The Gerridae or Water Striders of Oregon and Washington, (Hemiptera:Heteroptera)
 Image of Gerris remigis feeding

Hemiptera of North America
Gerrini
Insects described in 1832